Biddika Satyanarayana was an Indian politician. He was a Member of Parliament, representing Parvathipuram in the Lok Sabha, the lower house of India's Parliament, as a member of the Indian National Congress.

References

Lok Sabha members from Andhra Pradesh
Indian National Congress politicians
India MPs 1957–1962
India MPs 1962–1967
India MPs 1971–1977
Living people
Year of birth missing (living people)
Indian National Congress politicians from Andhra Pradesh